The Recluse Sisters (RM) are a Roman Catholic community of Religious Sisters who were founded in 1943, in Alberta, Canada, by Rita Renaud, Jeannette Roy and the Reverend Father Louis-Marie Parent, OMI, as Les Recluses Missionaires.  They are a monastic religious institute who practise perpetual adoration of the Eucharist, with an accent on prayer, silence and solitude in a cloistered way of life, which includes the Liturgy of the Hours (the Divine Office).
Their inspiration is the recluse Jeanne Le Ber (1662–1714), who lived in the early days of Montreal.  Today's Recluse Sisters live in the Monastery of the Annunciation, in Montreal, Quebec.

Foundress
Rita Renaud was born October 22 in Montreal, during the flu epidemic of 1918, and baptized two days later at the Church of St. John the Baptist. She obtained her degree from the Collège Marguerite Bourgeoys in 1939. She entered as a postulant, the Servants of the Blessed Sacrament in Quebec, but left after five months due to health problems. She and Jeannette Roy established a hermitage in a stable at the Renaud family property.

External links 
 The Recluse Sisters (in French and English)

Catholic female orders and societies
Christian organizations established in 1943
1943 establishments in Canada